Iota Canis Majoris, Latinized from ι Canis Majoris, is a solitary variable supergiant star in the southern constellation of Canis Major. It is visible to the naked eye with an apparent visual magnitude that varies between +4.36 and +4.40. The distance to this star is approximately 3,100 light years based on parallax measurements. It is drifting further away with a radial velocity of +41.2 km/s.

Iota Canis Majoris is a massive blue-white B-type supergiant with a stellar classification of B3 Ib. It has been classified as a Beta Cephei type variable star, but the supergiant spectral type and a period of over a month mean it is no longer considered to be of that type. This star is 14.8 million years old and is spinning with a projected rotational velocity of 27 km/s. It has 12.5 times the mass and 25.9 times the radius of the Sun.

The star displays a bow shock feature from its interaction with the interstellar medium, but this nebulosity is not aligned with the star's motion through the galaxy.

References

B-type supergiants
Beta Cephei variables
Canis Majoris, Iota
Canis Major
Durchmusterung objects
Canis Majoris, 20
051309
033347
2596